The New South Wales Sentencing Council is an advisory body established by the New South Wales Government to provide guidelines and to promote consistency in sentencing of offenders in New South Wales, a state of Australia. The council provides advice and counsel to the Attorney General of New South Wales on issues relating to sentencing, parole periods for sentences, trends, and the operation of parole. The council aims to promote consistency and transparency in sentencing and promoting public understanding of the sentencing process. The Sentencing Council consists of members appointed by the attorney general. Those members are made up from a diverse background to better represent the views of the community. They include retired judges, law enforcement officers, defence lawyers, indigenous community members and persons associated with victims of crime.

The council provides similar functions to other bodies in New South Wales and in Australia. For example, it may advocate law reform which overlaps the work of the New South Wales Law Reform Commission, or it may analyse statistics which overlaps the work of the Australian Bureau of Statistics. However, it differs fundamentally from other legal bodies in that it provides guidance and advice to government in that its focus is primarily criminal, and includes members who have direct and relevant experience with the criminal justice system.

The council was the first of its type established in Australia. A similar body has been established in Victoria which is called the Victorian Sentencing Council. Outside of Australia, overseas council perform similar functions. The United States Sentencing Commission in the United States of America and the Sentencing Council in England and Wales are examples of bodies which consist primarily of judicial members, giving those bodies a judicial flavour. In contrast, the Sentencing Commission for Scotland is made up of parliamentarians, giving it a political flavour. The New South Wales council attempts to balance each of these flavours by including a cross-section of the community within the council.

History of sentencing councils
The Australian Law Reform Commission notes that there has been a history in common law countries of the use of specific commissions to advise and report on sentencing practices. In 1833 in the United Kingdom, commissioners were appointed to report on consolidating all crimes and the laws relating to crimes into one Act of Parliament. Over a fifteen-year period, the commissioners reported upon many issues and problems concerning punishment and sentencing in criminal matters. They made recommendations about the grading of penalties to suit the crime and also about limiting judicial discretion in the determination a penalty. Few of the recommendations however became law.

In 1980, the Australian Law Reform Commission proposed the establishment of a national council to deal with federal offenders. This council was to be tentatively called the Australian Sentencing Council. The recommendation was not taken up by the Australian Government. In 1988, the commission recommended the establishment of a sentencing council within the Australian Institute of Criminology. Again, that recommendation was not taken up. In 2006, the commission reversed its view on the establishment of a national council and advocated that the existing federal institutions were adequate to provide advice and research. Primarily this was based on the view that the proposed council would duplicate and overlap existing bodies which provided crime statistics and law reform advice to the Australian Government. It however commended the work of the existing state based councils.

Composition
The council was initially composed of ten members who were to be appointed by the attorney general. Members could be appointed for a three-year term, and could also be appointed for further three-year terms from time to time. The attorney general also had the authority to appoint deputies to the members, so that the deputy could attend the council in the absence of the member.

Members include:
a retired judicial officer,
a person with expertise or experience in law enforcement,
various persons who have expertise or experience in criminal law or sentencing,
a person who has expertise or experience in the area of prosecution
a person who has expertise or experience in the area of defence
a person who has expertise or experience in Aboriginal justice matters
four are to be persons representing the general community, of whom two are to have expertise or experience in matters associated with victims of crime.

Current members
The legislation was changed in 2006 to expand the number of members of the council to thirteen. All members and deputy members continue to be appointed by the attorney general. , the current members are:

Notable former members
The inaugural members of the NSW Sentencing Council were:

Reports
One of the functions of the council is to make reports specific to sentencing. Since the commencement of the council, the council has made numerous reports to the attorney general. The attorney general has authorised the following reports to be made public and they are available on the council’s website:

Sentencing Trends and Practices 2005-2006
Abolishing Prison Sentences of Six Months or Less
Whether Attempt and Accessorial Offences should be included in the Standard Non-Parole Sentencing Scheme
Firearms Offences and the Standard Non-Parole Sentencing Scheme
How Best to Promote Consistency in Sentencing in the Local Court
Seeking a Guideline Judgment on Suspended Sentences.

See also

 Children's Court of New South Wales
List of New South Wales courts and tribunals

References

Sources
 
 Crimes (Sentencing Procedure) Act 1992 (NSW)

New South Wales courts and tribunals
Sentencing (law)
Australian criminal law